Echephyllides was an Ancient Greek grammarian or historian. He is mentioned by Stephanus of Byzantium, and by the scholia on Plato's Phaedo (p. 389).

References

Ancient Greek writers known only from secondary sources
Ancient Greek grammarians